Reticulocossus is a genus of moths in the family Cossidae. It contains only one species, Reticulocossus schoorli, which is found in northern Sulawesi.

References

Natural History Museum Lepidoptera generic names catalog

Cossinae